Kobble Creek is a rural locality in the Moreton Bay Region, Queensland, Australia.

Geography 

The south-eastern boundary of the locality is the Mount Samson Range. The name Kobble is derived from the Waka language, Garumngar dialect, word kabul meaning carpet snake.

The western part of the locality is mountainous and within the D'Aguilar National Park which extends further west into a number of other localities.

The land use in the eastern part of the locality is a mixture of rural residential, grazing on native vegetation and some cropping.

History 
The locality is named after the creek with that forms part of the catchment area of Lake Samsonvale, one of the three main water-suppliers to the metropolitan region.

Kobble Creek was, in years gone by, predominantly a dairy farming community with some banana and pineapple farming on surrounding hillsides. As a farming community, Kobble Creek supported a butter factory, primary school, and railway station, the latter two located near the site of the current Samsonvale Rural Fire Brigade. Following the forced resumption of much of the best farming land in the district to build the North Pine Dam and flood Lake Samsonvale, today the district is predominantly a rural-dormitory zone with very limited farming undertaken.

Kobble Creek Provisional School opened circa 1881. On 1 January 1909 it became Kobble Creek State School. It closed in 1954.

In 1919, the Dayboro railway line reached Kobble Creek with the Kobble railway station opening on 3 November 1919; the line reached its terminus at Dayboro railway station on 25 September 1920.

Kobble Creek was officially named and bounded as a locality in June 2009, but was formerly part of the Samsonvale district.

The median age of the Kobble Creek population was 39 years of age, two years above the Australian average.  77.8% of people living in Kobble Creek were born in Australia. The other top responses for country of birth were England 6.8%, New Zealand 3.4%, South Africa 0.8%, Canada 0.6%, Cyprus 0.6%. 92.6% of people spoke only English at home; the next most common languages were 0.6% German, and 0.6% American Languages.

References

Suburbs of Moreton Bay Region
Localities in Queensland